Devario kysonensis is a freshwater fish endemic to Nghệ An Province, Vietnam.

References

Fish of Vietnam
Cyprinid fish of Asia
Fish described in 2010
Devario